Raigarh is one of the 90 Legislative Assembly constituencies of Chhattisgarh state in India. It is in Raigarh district. The seat used to be part of Madhya Pradesh Legislative Assembly when Chhattisgarh was part of MP.

Members of Assembly

Madhya Pradesh Assembly, until 2000
 1962 : Niranjan Lal (INC)
 1998 : Krishna Kumar Gupta (INC)

Chhattisgarh Assembly, since 2000 
 2003 : Vijay Agrawal (BJP)
 2008 : S. Nayak (Congress)
 2013 : Roshan Lal (BJP)

Election results

1962 Assembly Election
 Niranjan Lal (INC) : 10,327 votes  
 Ram Kumar (PSP) : 7,405

1998 Assembly Election
 Krishna Kumar (INC) : 39,147 votes  
 Rosanlal (BJP) : 37,263

2003 Assembly Election
 Vijay Agrawal (BJP) : 52,310 votes  
 Krishna Kumar (INC) : 43,871

2018 Assembly Election

See also 
 Raigarh District
 List of constituencies of Chhattisgarh Legislative Assembly

References 

Raigarh district
Assembly constituencies of Chhattisgarh